Greg Brooks (born December 16, 1980 in New Orleans, Louisiana) is a former American football cornerback with the Cincinnati Bengals in the National Football League.  He played high school football at Archbishop Shaw High School in Marrero, Louisiana.

External links
NFL.com player page
Bengals All-Time Roster

1980 births
Living people
American football cornerbacks
Southern Miss Golden Eagles football players
Cincinnati Bengals players
Players of American football from New Orleans